"The News" is a song by American rock band Paramore, released as the second single from their sixth studio album This Is Why on December 8, 2022. It was written by Hayley Williams, Taylor York, and Zac Farro and produced by Carlos de la Garza. The song was accompanied by its music video, released the same day.

Background
"The News" was released on December 8, 2022. According to Williams, "'The News' is one of those songs that came together pretty quickly and felt exciting from the start. It feels like a happy medium between classic Paramore angst and bringing in some influences we've always had but never exploited...watching Zac track drums for this one was one of my favorite memories from the studio."

Composition
"The News" is a post-punk, alternative rock, and math rock song. According to Loudwire, "the song...is a more driving, upbeat rocker within the verses, but pulls back to deliver a more hypnotic...chorus".

Music video
The music video was released the same day as the song and was directed by Mike Kluge and Matthew DeLisi.

Personnel
 Hayley Williams – vocals, backing vocals, composition
 Taylor York – guitar, composition
 Zac Farro – drums, percussion, composition

Charts

References

2022 singles
2022 songs
Paramore songs
Post-punk songs
Songs written by Hayley Williams
Songs written by Taylor York
Atlantic Records singles